The Best Kept Secret is the fourth studio album by American hip hop group Ultramagnetic MCs. It was released on January 9, 2007, via DMAFT Records. Audio production was handled by Ariel 'Cartel' Caban and Ultramagnetic MCs' members DJ Moe Love, Ced Gee, and Kool Keith under his moniker Underwear Pissy. The album cover features the original line-up, but T.R. Love, as well as longtime associate Tim Dog, do not appear on the record. The album featured guest appearances from Gee-Banga and Goody-2.

The album was preceded by a 2006 single "Mechanism Nice (Born Twice) / Nottz", but neither the single, nor the album did not hit any major chart and, to date, The Best Kept Secret is the group's recent effort.

Track listing

Sample credits
"Delta 2006" contains elements from "Blues and Pants" by James Brown (1971)

Personnel
Keith Matthew Thornton – main artist, producer (tracks: 2, 6, 7, 9, 11)
Cedric Ulmont Miller – main artist, producer (tracks: 4, 8, 10, 12)
Maurice Russell Smith – main artist, producer (tracks: 3, 14)
Ariel Caban – producer (tracks: 1, 5, 13)
Mark Copeland – project manager
Carl Caprioglio – executive producer
Kurt Lindsay – engineer
Hernon Santiago – mixing
Mark Likosky – photography

References

External links

2007 albums
Ultramagnetic MCs albums